A.D. The Bible Continues (also known as A.D. Kingdom and Empire) is an American biblical drama television miniseries, based on the Bible, and a sequel to the 2013 miniseries, The Bible, and follows up from the film Son of God which was a more in depth look on Jesus's story. It was produced by Roma Downey, Mark Burnett, and Richard Bedser. The limited series began airing on NBC on Easter Sunday, April 5, 2015, in twelve weekly one-hour episodes. The story takes place immediately after the events of The Bible miniseries, and then of the Son of God film, beginning with the crucifixion and resurrection of Jesus, and continues with the first ten chapters of the Acts of the Apostles. On July 3, 2015, NBC cancelled A.D. The Bible Continues after one season.

Cast

Main
 Adam Levy as Peter
 Babou Ceesay as John
 Alastair Mackenzie as James, brother of Jesus
 Denver Isaac as James the Great
 Emmett J. Scanlan as Saul of Tarsus
 Fraser Ayres as Simon the Zealot
 Chipo Chung as Mary Magdalene
 Jóhannes Haukur Jóhannesson as Thomas
 Pedro Lloyd Gardiner as Matthew
 Kenneth Collard as Barnabas
 Joe Dixon as Philip the Evangelist
 Reece Ritchie as Stephen
 Richard Coyle as Caiaphas
 Vincent Regan as Pontius Pilate
 Joanne Whalley as Claudia, wife of Pontius Pilate

Supporting

 Juan Pablo Di Pace as Jesus
 Greta Scacchi as Mary
 Kevin Doyle as Joseph of Arimathea
 Helen Daniels as Maya, daughter of Peter
 Struan Rodger as Gamaliel
 Nicholas Sidi as Ananias of Damascus
 Marama Corlett as Tabitha
 Farzana Dua Elahe as Joanna
 Jim Sturgeon as Chuza
 Colin Salmon as the Ethiopian eunuch
 Will Thorp as Cornelius the Centurion
 James Callis as Herod Antipas
 Claire Cooper as Herodias
 Jodhi May as Leah, wife of Caiaphas
 Ken Bones as Annas
 Lex Shrapnel as Jonathan, son of Annas
 Andrew Gower as Caligula 
 Kenneth Cranham as Tiberius
 Michael Peluso as Herod Agrippa
 Stephen Walters as Simon the Sorcerer
 Peter De Jersey as Ananias, husband of Sapphira
 Indra Ové as Sapphira
 Chris Brazier as Reuben
  as Boaz
 Charlene McKenna as Eva
 Francis Magee as Levi, the leader of the Zealots
 John Benfield as Yitzhak, student of Simon the Sorcerer
 John Ioannou as Melek, a healed cripple

Development
On December 17, 2013, it was announced that there would be a follow-up miniseries to The Bible in 2015.

In anticipation of the global event, a number of companion materials were released in an effort by Palam Fidelis Publishing to engage thoughtful, religious discussion by offering "Family Discussion Guides" for each episode.

Episodes

Reception
The show premiered on Easter Sunday 2015 on NBC to 9.7 million viewers. It averaged 6.5 million viewers across 12 episodes on NBC. Although the series has a strong viewership for the Easter Sunday premiere, ratings dropped significantly over the 12-week broadcast. NBC would cancel the series after one season.   Producers Burnett and Downey said that they planned future biblical productions on an OTT digital channel in 2015, but as of 2022 a follow-up has not been released.

A.D.: The Bible Continues has received mixed reviews from critics. On the aggregate website Metacritic, the series has a weighted average score of 55 out of 100 based on 11 critics, indicating "mixed or average reviews". On Rotten Tomatoes reported that 58 percent of critics have given the film a positive review based on 12 reviews, with an average rating of 4.78/10. The site's critics consensus reads, "Attempts to offer a fresh look at a traditional tale notwithstanding, A.D.: The Bible Continues doesn't do enough to set itself apart from its many predecessors."

In Australia, the series premiered on July 5, 2015, on the Nine Network, as A.D. Kingdom and Empire. It premiered to 472,000 viewers, losing 828,000 viewers from its 60 Minutes lead-in.

References

External links

 

2010s American drama television miniseries
2015 American television series debuts
2015 American television series endings
2015 television films
Cultural depictions of Judas Iscariot
Cultural depictions of Pontius Pilate
Films set in ancient Egypt
NBC original programming
Television series based on the Bible
Television series by MGM Television
Television series created by Mark Burnett
Television series created by Roma Downey
Television series set in the Roman Empire
Television shows set in Egypt
Television shows set in Israel
Television shows set in Palestine
Television shows set in Syria
Works based on the New Testament
Cultural depictions of Saint Peter
Portrayals of Mary Magdalene in film
Portrayals of Jesus on television
Cultural depictions of Mary, mother of Jesus
Television series set in the 1st century